Dom Constantino was the child Portuguese puppet and last titular King of Jaffna in the 17th century, whose reign lasted from 1619 to 1624. He succeeded Cankili II. With the conquest of the Jaffna kingdom and the end of the monarch Dom Constantino was succeeded by Filipe de Oliveira, as Captain-major.

See also
 List of Jaffna monarchs
 Jaffna kingdom

References

1619 deaths
Kings of Jaffna
Year of birth unknown
17th-century monarchs in Asia